Paul Anthony Christie is an American voice actor. He was born and raised in Manhattan. Christie has worked as an artist, writer, actor, songwriter, narrator, comedian, and voice actor.

In the 1970s Christie was a contributing editor for Crawdaddy magazine. In the 1980s he performed stand up in and around New York and was a founding member of the improvisational group The House Band. His graphic artwork was well known in New York through Kid Christie, the company he co-founded with Theresa Fiorentino. As a writer Christie co-wrote the Meat Loaf albums Midnight at the Lost and Found, and Blind Before I Stop. He is probably best known over the past 35 years as a voice artist. Over his award winning career Christie has done thousands of commercials for clients including Chrysler, Dominoes, Pontiac, Canon, Calvin Klein, and voiced "Louie the Lizard" for Budweiser.

Christie created the character of Vinnie, the wise guy panda, for Fox's Biscuits in England and Zook for CTW's "Zook and Allison". Some other well known roles include Carr in Adult Swim's "Stroker and Hoop", and the handsome Ram in Disney's "Brother Bear".

As a narrator Christie has worked for Discovery, the “Nature” series on PBS, A&E (TV channel), History (American TV network), Biography, Food Network, MTV, HBO, Showtime, and others. For ”Nature” his credits include the six-part series "Deep Jungle", as well as "Owl Power", "Killers in Eden", and "Can Animals Predict Disaster" among others. Presently he narrates the Discovery series "Gold Rush", "Dual Survival", ”Dave Turins Lost Mines”, “Parker’s Trail”, “Freddie Dodge Mine Rescue”, ”Gold Rush White Water”, and “The Mystery at Frog Ranch”.

In the 1990s Christie voiced Stick Stickly for Nick's "Nick in the Afternoon", created by Agi Fodor and Karen Kuflik. He later voiced Moose A. Moose, the host of Noggin, who was introduced on April 7, 2003. Christie continued to voice Moose after the Noggin brand was revived as a mobile app in 2015.

Christie was also the New York president of the Screen Actors Guild from 2003-2007. During that same time frame he also served as the 2nd national vice president of the guild. He served on the board of directors from 2000-2009.

Filmography

Television
 1992 - Square One TV - Zook (3 episodes)
 1995–1998 - Nick in the Afternoon - Stick Stickly (voice)
 2003–2012, 2015–2019 - Moose and Zee - Moose A. Moose (voice)
 2004–2005 - Stroker & Hoop - C.A.R.R. (voice, 13 episodes)
 2005 - Saturday Night Live (2 episodes)
 2008 - Click and Clack's As the Wrench Turns - Antique Roadkill host/Jerry the first caller (voice, 4 episodes)
 2010–2016 - Dual Survival - Narrator (84 episodes)
 2010–present - Gold Rush - Narrator
 2018–2019 - Our Cartoon President - Jim Mattis (voice) (10 episodes)

Film
 1982 - Girls Nite Out - Dancer
 1996 - The Weinerville Election Special: From Washington, D.C. - Stick Stickly (voice)
 2001 - Osmosis Jones - Dan Matter and Germ (voice)
 2003 - Brother Bear - Ram #1 (voice)

Video games
 1996 - Nickelodeon 3D Movie Maker - Stick Stickly
 2003 - Max Payne 2: The Fall of Max Payne - Godfather
 2003 - Brother Bear - Ram #2
 2004 - Def Jam: Fight for NY - Jervis
 2006 - Def Jam Fight for NY: The Takeover - Jervis
 2010 - Alan Wake - Paul Randolph, Rudolf Lane
 2011 - Homefront -

Other
 1997–2000, voice of Louie the Lizard from the "Budweiser Lizards" commercials.
 2003–present, voice of Moose A. Moose, host of Noggin.
 1995–present: reprised his role as Stick Stickly  for The '90s Are All That'' "U Pick" segments Friday nights.

References

External links

Voice Chasers profile
TV Guide profile
New York Times profile

Living people
Male actors from New York City
American male voice actors
American male video game actors
Jewish American male actors
21st-century American male actors
People from Manhattan
1951 births
21st-century American Jews